"Kip Carpenter" was also a nickname of Richard Carpenter (screenwriter)

Kip Carpenter (born April 30, 1979) is an American speedskater who competed in the 2002 Winter Olympics, as well as the 2006 Winter Olympics, winning a bronze medal in the 500 meter race at the 2002 games, while also skating the fastest lap in Olympic history in the 500 meter race with a time of 24.87 for a 400 meter. He was a member of the USA National Sprint Team, as well as the DSB Corporate Sprint Team, being coached by Ryan Shimabukuro and Jeroen Otter. At the end of the 2007-2008 season Kip retired from professional speed skating to coach an elite speed skating team Swift Speedskating in Milwaukee, Wisconsin. Currently, he is the assistant coach for the Dutch National Team.

Background 
Kip was born in Kalamazoo, Michigan. He later moved to Brookfield, Wisconsin to train at the U.S Olympic Training Facility, the Pettit National Ice Center, in Milwaukee.

A former short-track speed skater, Carpenter made the transition to long track in 1998. Three years later, he placed among the top dozen in the 500m at the 2001 World Single Distance Championships. He is best known for his flawless form on the turns from his years skating short track which gives him a distinct advantage over most skaters. Since Salt Lake Kip continues to be one of the best American sprinters, finishing second in the overall U.S. Sprint Championships standings in 2004. He's also been a force on the international scene, finishing in the top 10 in the 500m, 1000m and overall standings at both the 2003 and 2004 World Sprints Championships. Carpenter also tallied two top 10 finishes in the 500m (eight and seventh) at the 2003 and 2004 World Single Distance Championships, and was sixth in the 1000m in 2004. Carpenter finished eighth in the 500m at the 2005 World Single Distance Championships and ranked 11th in the 500m and 12th in the 1000m in the 2006/2007 World Cup standings, as well as finishing 15th in the 500m and 12th in the 1000m in the 2007/2008 World Cup standings.

Started skating in 1983...father skated for fun and passed the sport on to Kip and his brother Cory...first ice rink was in his backyard and during the winter his father would line the backyard with plastic and flood it with a hose...Kip and Cory would push chairs around the ice to learn how to balance...considers his greatest accomplishment as being an Olympic bronze medalist from the Salt Lake Games because "it's something an athlete dreams and works towards for their entire career.  It was a dream come true"...cites his strongest influences to be his mother's struggle through surviving breast cancer, and Coach Mike Crowe teaching him "incredible skating technique and the ability to think outside the box"...also cites a "fire inside that burns to represent my country well and do 'right' for America and American athletics"...owns an Italian greyhound named "Swift"...plans to get a degree in business...enjoys listening to techno, electronic, dance and industrial music...favorite foods are pizza and olives...favorite movies are "Fight Club", "Interview With The Vampire", Minority Report" and "The Matrix".

References

External links
 
 PB's Kip and a link to results International Championships
 Photos of Kip Carpenter
 Kip's U.S. Olympic Team bio

1979 births
Living people
American male speed skaters
Speed skaters at the 2002 Winter Olympics
Speed skaters at the 2006 Winter Olympics
Olympic bronze medalists for the United States in speed skating
People from Brookfield, Wisconsin
Sportspeople from the Milwaukee metropolitan area
Medalists at the 2002 Winter Olympics
Sportspeople from Kalamazoo, Michigan
Speed skating coaches